Baimaoping is a rural town in Chengbu Miao Autonomous County, Hunan, China. It is surrounded by Rulin Town on the north, Tingping Township on the west, Lanrong Township on the east, and Guali Township of Ziyuan County on the south.

Name
The name of "Baimaoping" comes from the white elymus repens on the riverbanks in the territory. "Bai" means white, "Mao" means elymus repens and "Ping" means riverbanks.

History
In 1995, the townships of Dayang and Qingyuan merged into Baimaoping Township.

On 17 January 2019, it was upgraded to a town.

Administrative division
As of 2015, the town is divided into 18 villages: Baimaoping, Xiaozhai, Hengbanqiao, Baitou'ao, Shengli, Taiping, Dachaping, Yuanjiashan, Heping, Dayang, Daheng, Aoling, Huangsan, Zhaungtuanyuan, Chengxi, Lawu, Gewu, and Katian.

Geography
The town is located in the southeast of Chengbu Miao Autonomous County.

The Wushui River flows through the town.

Demographics
In December 2015, the town had an estimated population of 16,600 and a population density of 55 persons per km2. Miao people is the dominant ethnic group in the township, accounting for 9,900, accounting for 59.64%. There are also 13 ethnic groups, such as Dong, Hui, Zhuang, and Manchu. Among them, there are 3,300 Han people (19.88%) and 2,600 Dong, Manchu, Hui and Zhuang people (15.66%).

Economy
The town's economy is based on nearby mineral resources and agricultural resources. The main agricultural products are lacquer, chestnut, wood, winter bamboo shoots, osmunda, litsea cubeba, etc. The region abounds with manganese, silicon, lead, zinc, and zeolite.

Transport
The County Road X090 passes across the town. Due to the mountainous terrain the road is the only transportation option.

References

Chengbu Miao Autonomous County